The Directory for Family Worship is a book of general directions for private, family worship in the Calvinist tradition. While generally approving of the products of the Westminster Assembly (namely, the Westminster Standards), the Church of Scotland viewed it as incomplete without directions for private worship. The Directory was approved by the General Assembly at Edinburgh, Scotland on August 24, 1647.  The directory became the standard of family worship in the Church of Scotland and has been influential within Presbyterian churches worldwide.  In America, for example, it was highlighted in 1733 by the Synod of Philadelphia to seek "some proper means to revive the declining Power of Godliness," recommended "to all our ministers and members to take particular Care about visiting families, and press family and secret worship, according to the Westminster Directory."

References

Bibliography
J. W. Alexander (1850). The Nature, Warrant, and History of Family Worship. Alexander was the eldest son of Archibald Alexander, the first professor of Princeton Theological Seminary.
A Westminster Bibliography (Part 6) by Dr. Richard Bacon (1996), An investigation of the Westminster Assembly regarding the construction of this document.

External links
 The Directory for Family Worship

Calvinist texts
Presbyterianism